"HIStory" is a 1995 song by American singer-songwriter Michael Jackson. It was composed by Jackson, James Harris III and Terry Lewis, and was included on his album HIStory: Past, Present and Future, Book I. Although the original version of "HIStory" was not released as a single, it was later remixed in 1997 as part of Jackson's remix album project Blood on the Dance Floor: HIStory in the Mix. These remixes would be released as part of "HIStory/Ghosts", a double A-side single with the newly recorded song "Ghosts" as the second single from that album.

Production
"HIStory" was originally written and composed by Michael Jackson, James Harris III and Terry Lewis in 1995. It was the thirteenth track on the studio album HIStory, but was not released as a single. The song sampled multiple musical compositions and historical audio quotes, all of which were dispersed throughout the track. Early in the track, one included quotes from an interview with a young Michael Jackson from 1970. Musical compositions sampled include "Beethoven Lives Upstairs" and "The Great Gate of Kyiv" from Pictures at an Exhibition. In reissues of the album, the Pictures at an Exhibition piece was replaced by a similar improvised orchestra piece, but the original sample was used in Jackson's live performances in the HIStory Tour. Audio quotes sampled were Lowell Thomas's "Charles Lindbergh Report" of Lindbergh's 1927 landing in Paris, a report on Hank Aaron, Ted Kennedy's 1968 eulogy for brother Robert F. Kennedy, the 1939 "Farewell to Baseball" by Lou Gehrig, the 1940 "Greetings to the Children of England" radio address by Princess Elizabeth and Princess Margaret, quotes from Muhammad Ali, Thomas Edison, and Dr. Martin Luther King Jr.'s 1963 speech "I Have a Dream". 

In 1997, Jackson issued the remix album Blood on the Dance Floor: HIStory in the Mix. Remixes were done by Tony Moran, Mark Picchiotti, and The Ummah, although only one of Tony Moran's remixes, titled "HIStory (Tony Moran's HIStory Lesson)" was included on the album. This and the rest of the remixes were included on various commercial and promotional releases of the double A-side release "HIStory/Ghosts", the second single from the album.

Music video

The music video that accompanied the remix opens with the scene of a woman, relaxing on a futuristic sofa, watching the music video through metallic virtual reality goggles. The video is set in a nightclub. Inside the club, televisions, monitors and walls display the history of Jackson's filmography such as "Don't Stop 'Til You Get Enough", "Rock with You", "Beat It", "The Way You Make Me Feel", "Man in the Mirror", "Dirty Diana", "Smooth Criminal", "Black or White", "Remember the Time", "In the Closet", "Jam", "Will You Be There", "Scream", "Earth Song", "They Don't Care About Us", "Stranger in Moscow", "Blood on the Dance Floor", scenes from his short film Ghosts, and live performances from the Bad and Dangerous tours. Wearing the goggles, the woman is led to believe she is in the nightclub too. The video ends with the woman removing the goggles.

Chart performance

"HIStory/Ghosts" did generally well in music charts worldwide, having charted within the top-ten and top-twenty in multiple countries. In the Netherlands, Belgium and Sweden "HIStory/Ghosts" spent seventeen to eighteen weeks on the charts. In Australia "HIStory/Ghosts" peaked at forty-three before falling off the chart. The single did not appear on any United States Billboard charts.

Track listing
CD Single
 "HIStory (7" HIStory Lesson Edit)" – 4:08
 "HIStory (Mark!'s Radio Edit)" – 4:16
 "HIStory (Mark!'s Vocal Club Mix)" – 9:11
 "HIStory (The Ummah Radio Mix)" – 5:00
 "HIStory (The Ummah DJ Mix)" – 3:04
 "HIStory (The Ummah Main A Cappella)" – 4:06
 "Ghosts (Radio Edit)" – 3:50
12" Single
 "Ghosts (Mousse T's Club Mix)" – 6:03
 "Ghosts (Mousse T's Radio Rock)" – 4:25
 "HIStory (Tony Moran's HIStorical Dub)" – 7:56
 "HIStory (7" HIStory Lesson Edit)" – 4:09

Remixes

The Ummah Mixes
 "HIStory (The Ummah Radio Mix)" – 5:00
 "HIStory (The Ummah Urban Mix)" – 4:19
 "HIStory (The Ummah DJ Mix)" – 3:04
 "HIStory (The Ummah Main A Cappella)" – 4:06 
Tony Moran Mixes
 "HIStory (Tony Moran's HIStory Lesson)" – 8:01
 "HIStory (Tony Moran's HIStorical Dub)" – 7:56
 "HIStory (Tony Moran's 7" HIStory Lesson Edit)" – 4:08 
Mark Picchiotti Mixes
 "HIStory (Mark!'s Vocal Club Mix)" – 9:11
 "HIStory (Mark!'s Keep Movin' Dub)" – 9:16
 "HIStory (Mark!'s Radio Edit)" – 4:16

Note: The Mark Picchiotti remixes were alternatively titled "HIStory (Mark!'s Phly Vocal)" and "HIStory (Mark!'s Future Dub)" on certain releases, notably a few widely distributed promo records in the United Kingdom.

Charts
All entries charts as "HIStory / Ghosts" except where noted.

Weekly charts

Year-end charts

Personnel
Tony Moran's HIStory Lesson remix
 Written and composed Michael Jackson, James Harris III and Terry Lewis
 Produced by Michael Jackson, Jimmy Jam & Terry Lewis
 Remix by Tony Moran
 Additional production by Tony Moran and Bob Rosa
 Mixed by Bob Rosa
 Engineered and programming by Tony Coluccio
 Additional programming by Giuseppe D.
 Vocals by Michael Jackson and Boyz II Men
 Ending solo vocal by Leah Frazier

See also
 List of anti-war songs

Notes

References
 George, Nelson (2004). Michael Jackson: The Ultimate Collection booklet. Sony BMG.
 
 

1995 songs
1997 singles
Anti-war songs
Songs based on speech samples
Epic Records singles
Michael Jackson songs
Protest songs
Songs written by Jimmy Jam and Terry Lewis
Songs written by Michael Jackson
Song recordings produced by Michael Jackson
Song recordings produced by Jimmy Jam and Terry Lewis